Excitatory amino-acid transporter 5 (EAAT5) is a protein that in humans is encoded by the SLC1A7 gene.

EAAT5 is expressed predominantly in the retina, has high affinity for the excitatory amino acid L-glutamate.  When stimulated by this amino acid, EAAT5 conducts chloride ions.

References

Further reading

Solute carrier family
Glutamate (neurotransmitter)